Dysaethria fulvihamata is a moth of the family Uraniidae first described by George Hampson in . It is found in Sri Lanka, Taiwan, Hong Kong, the Ryukyu Islands and Borneo.

The wings are dark grey with black marks. The fasciae in the forewing are angular, whereas submarginal mark is narrow. In the hindwings, a band interior to the postmedial, dorsal to its angle is marked with black. A pale region is exterior to it.

Gallery

References

Moths of Asia
Moths described in 1912
Uraniidae